A Cabinet piece may refer to:

a Cabinet painting
a porcelain object too fine for regular use, such as a cabinet cup